Cullen Bay is an album by the Scottish traditional folk band The Tannahill Weavers, released in 1990. The band is joined on several tracks (Braw Burn the Bridges, Jenny Dang the Weaver and A Night Visitor's Song) by cittern-player Stuart Morison. Cullen Bay itself is at Cullen, Moray on the coast of the Moray Firth, west of Spey Bay between the towns of Elgin and Banff.  The album was recorded at Pierhouse Studios, Edinburgh, Scotland.

Track listing
The Standard on the Braes O'Mar / The Haughs O' Cromdale
The Fiddler / The Fiddler's Jig / Jenny Dang the Weaver / The Reel of Tulloch
Joy of My Heart
Aikendrum
Samuel the Weaver / The Panda / Thunderhead / The Cannongate Twitch / Allan MacDonald's Reel
Kintail
A Night Visitor's Song
Cullen Bay / Dalnahassaig / S'Iomadh Rud a Chunnaic Mi / Alick C. MacGregor
Braw Burn the Bridges

Personnel
Roy Gullane - guitar, vocals
Iain MacInnes - Highland bagpipes, Scottish small pipes, whistles
John Martin - fiddle, 'cello, vocals
Phil Smillie - flute, whistles, bodhrán, vocals
Les Wilson - bouzouki, keyboards, bass pedals, vocals

References

1990 albums
The Tannahill Weavers albums